Numedalslågen is a river located in the counties of Vestfold and Telemark and Viken in southeastern Norway.  It is one of the longest rivers in Norway.

Location
Numedalslågen stretches for over  through the counties of Vestfold and Telemark and Viken_(county), beginning at the Hardangervidda plateau and meeting the ocean at Larvik in Vestfold. Numedalslågen is one of Norway's longest rivers. The river runs through the municipalities Larvik, Lardal, Kongsberg, Flesberg, Rollag and Nore og Uvdal. These municipalities cooperate in the administration and use of resources connected to the river in various projects under the  Green Valley (Grønn Dal) umbrella.

There are a number of hydroelectric plants in the higher range of Numedalslågen. Most of the power potential of the main river is developed, except the stretch between Hvittingfoss and Larvik and Godfarfossen in Dagali. Nore I kraftverk, the first power plant built in the Nore municipality in Viken used Norefallene between Tunhovdfjorden and Rødberg. It was completed in 1928 and was designed by Norwegian architects Carl Buch and Lorentz Harboe Ree. Nore II kraftverk uses the drop between Rødberg dam and Norefjord and was completed in 1947.

Numedalslågen is known for being a good location for salmon fishing, although a parasite known as Gyrodactylus salaris has recently been found in Numedalslågen that may pose a threat to its salmon stock. Among the other fish species of Numedalslågen are trout, eel, and pike.

Name
The first element is name of the Numedal River. The second element is the finite form of låg (Norse 'lǫgr m) "water; river", but the river was originally called Nauma and is the origin of the valley's name.

Gallery

See also
Gudbrandsdalslågen
List of rivers of Norway

References

Other sources
Nasjonalgalleriet and Riksantikvaren (1982) Norsk Kunstnerleksikon   (Oslo: Universitetsforlaget) 
Tråen, Even, Tor Bjørvik & Sølver Sjulstad  (2001) Livet langs Numedalslågen (Oslo) 

Rivers of Vestfold og Telemark
Rivers of Viken
Larvik
Kongsberg
Rivers of Norway